In Greek mythology, Cleophyle (Ancient Greek: Κλεοφύλης) was an Arcadian queen as wife of King Lycurgus, son of Aleus and Neaera. She was the mother of his four sons: Ancaeus, Epochus, Amphidamas, and Iasius. Otherwise, the name of Lycurgus' wife was called Eurynome or Antinoe.

Notes

References 

 Apollodorus, The Library with an English Translation by Sir James George Frazer, F.B.A., F.R.S. in 2 Volumes, Cambridge, MA, Harvard University Press; London, William Heinemann Ltd. 1921. . Online version at the Perseus Digital Library. Greek text available from the same website.
 Pausanias, Description of Greece with an English Translation by W.H.S. Jones, Litt.D., and H.A. Ormerod, M.A., in 4 Volumes. Cambridge, MA, Harvard University Press; London, William Heinemann Ltd. 1918. . Online version at the Perseus Digital Library
 Pausanias, Graeciae Descriptio. 3 vols. Leipzig, Teubner. 1903.  Greek text available at the Perseus Digital Library.

Women in Greek mythology
Characters in Greek mythology